Don Budge defeated Gene Mako in the final, 6–3, 6–8, 6–2, 6–1 to win the men's singles tennis title at the 1938 U.S. National Championships. He became the first player in tennis history to complete the Grand Slam.

Seeds
The tournament used two lists of eight players for seeding the men's singles event; one for U.S. players and one for foreign players. Don Budge is the champion; others show the round in which they were eliminated.

U.S.
  Don Budge (champion)
  Bobby Riggs (fourth round)
  Joseph Hunt (quarterfinals)
  Sidney Wood (semifinals)
  Elwood Cooke (third round)
  Frank Kovacs (third round)
  Frank Parker (fourth round)
  Bryan Grant (quarterfinals)

Foreign
  John Bromwich (semifinals)
  Adrian Quist (fourth round)
  Franjo Punčec (fourth round)
  Bernard Destremau (first round)
  Yvon Petra (fourth round)
  Franjo Kukuljević (fourth round)
  Fumiteru Nakano (second round)
  Charles Hare (fourth round)

Draw

Key
 Q = Qualifier
 WC = Wild card
 LL = Lucky loser
 r = Retired

Finals

Earlier rounds

Section 1

Section 2

Section 3

Section 4

Section 5

Section 6

Section 7

Section 8

References

External links
 1938 U.S. National Championships on ITFtennis.com, the source for this draw

Men's Singles
1938